The Vallo di Diano (also known as Valdiano) is an Italian valley of the south-eastern side of Campania, in the province of Salerno.

Geography
Situated between the Alburni mountains and the borders of Campania with Basilicata, it is considered a geographical subregion of Cilento and is part of the Cilento and Vallo di Diano National Park, World Heritage Site of Italy from 1998. The greatest forestal park, mainly located in cilentan side, is Pruno.

The area is composed by 17 municipalities, and the greatest one is Sala Consilina, with c. 12,500 inhabitants. The others are Atena Lucana, Auletta, Buonabitacolo, Caggiano, Casalbuono, Monte San Giacomo, Montesano sulla Marcellana, Padula, Pertosa, Polla, San Pietro al Tanagro, Sant'Arsenio, San Rufo, Sanza, Sassano and Teggiano.

Transport
The valley is served by the A2 motorway Salerno-Reggio Calabria, with the exits of Petina, Polla, Atena Lucana, Sala Consilina and Padula-Buonabitacolo. From this last exit it departs a speedway to Policastro Bussentino and Sapri with exits in Buonabitacolo and Sanza.

It was also served by the railway line Sicignano-Lagonegro, closed since 1987 for works and connected to Salerno–Potenza–Taranto railway line.

See also

Cilento
Padula Charterhouse
Pertosa Caves
Cilentan Coast
Cilento and Vallo di Diano National Park
Cilentan language

References

External links

 Cilento and Vallo di Diano National Park
 Mountain Community of Vallo di Diano

Valleys of Campania
Cilento
Province of Salerno
World Heritage Sites in Italy